Including players from the Gold Coast Titans that have represented while at the club and the years that they achieved their honours, if known. Representatives from the Burleigh Bears, Ipswich Jets, Tweed Heads Seagulls and Past Gold Coast franchises are included as they are feeder clubs.

International

Australia
531    Wally Lewis (1991)
570    Dale Shearer (1993)
706    Luke Bailey (2007, 2009)
729    Scott Prince (2008)
754    Anthony Laffranchi (2008–09)
743    Greg Bird (2010, 2012–15)
769    Nate Myles (2012-15)
836    Tino Fa'asuamaleaui (2022)

Cook Islands
    Dominique Peyroux (2009)
    Brad Takairangi (2013)
    Esan Marsters (2022)

Fiji
    Jarryd Hayne (2017)
    Ben Nakubuwai (2017)

Ireland
 Jaimin Jolliffe (2022)

Italy
    Mark Minichiello (2013)

New Zealand
593    Brent Todd (1992–93)
719    Jake Webster (2007)
771    Kevin Proctor (2017-19)
805    Isaac Liu (2022)

Papua New Guinea
    David Mead (2008–16)
    Trevor Exton (2008)
    Ryan Tongia  (2010)
    Nene McDonald (2016)
    Jacob Alick (2022)

Philippines
    Matt Srama (2012)
    Kevin Gordon (2012)

Samoa
    Smith Samau (2008)
    Sam Tagataese (2009)

Scotland
    Luke Douglas (2013-16)

Tonga
    Lelea Paea (2007)
    Esikeli Tonga (2008)
    Konrad Hurrell (2017-18)
    Moeaki Fotuaika (2022)
    David Fifita (2022)

United States
    Matthew Petersen (2007)
    David Myles (2007)
    Eddy Pettybourne (2017)

Wales
    Kevin Ellis (1996)

State Of Origin

Queensland
42    Bob Lindner (1989)
09    Wally Lewis (1991)
43    Dale Shearer (1992–93)
67    Steve Jackson (1992–93)
69    Mike McLean (1992)
81    Adrian Vowles (1994)
89    Ben Ikin (1995)
99    Jamie Goddard (1997–98)
143    Scott Prince (2008)
151    Ashley Harrison (2008–13)
158    Nate Myles (2012-15)
169    David Taylor (2014)
189    Jarrod Wallace (2017-19)
196    Jai Arrow (2018-20)
204    AJ Brimson (2020-21)
207    Phillip Sami (2020)
213    Moeaki Fotuaika (2020-21)
200    David Fifita (2021)
209    Tino Fa'asuamaleaui (2021-22)

New South Wales
171    Luke Bailey (2007, 2009)
212    Anthony Laffranchi (2008–09)
206    Greg Bird (2010-14, 16)
200    Jarryd Hayne (2017)
266    Nathan Peats (2017)

All Stars Game

Indigenous All Stars
 Scott Prince (2010-12)
 Greg Bird (2010-13, 2016)
 Preston Campbell (2010) 
 Ryan James (2011, 2013, 2015–17)
 Jamal Idris (2012)
 Aiden Sezer (2013)
 Brad Tighe (2015)
 Josh Hoffman (2015)
 Kierran Moseley (2015)
 Tyrone Roberts (2016-20)
 Ashley Taylor (2017)
 Nathan Peats (2017-20)
 Leilani Latu (2019)
 Tyrone Peachey (2019-20)
 Jamal Fogarty (2021)
 David Fifita (2021-22)
 Corey Thompson (2021)
 Brian Kelly (2021)
 Will Smith (2022)

NRL All Stars
    Luke Bailey (2010, 2012)
    Ashley Harrison (2011, 2013)
    David Taylor (2015)
    Nene MacDonald (2016)
    Chris McQueen (2017)

Māori All Stars
    Kevin Proctor (2019-20, 2022)
    Patrick Herbert (2021-22)
    Erin Clark (2022)
    Esan Marsters (2022)

City Vs Country Origin

NSW Country
    Anthony Laffranchi (2007–08, 2010)
    Preston Campbell (2007)
    Greg Bird (2010, 2012)
    Luke Douglas (2012)
    Ryan James (2013, 2015)
    Kevin Gordon (2014)
    David Mead (2014-15)
    Anthony Don (2017)

NSW City
    Mark Minichiello (2007–12)
    Brett Delaney (2008)
    Beau Falloon (2014)
    James Roberts (2015)

Other honours

Prime Minister's XIII
    Scott Prince (2007–08, 2012)
    Brett Delaney (2008)
    Greg Bird (2011, 2013–14)
    Aidan Sezer (2013)
   Ryan James (2013, 2016)
    Kevin Gordon (2013)
    Kane Elgey (2015)
    Daniel Mortimer (2015)
    Jai Arrow (2019)
    Jojo Fifita (2022)
    Tino Fa'asuamaleaui (2022)
    Beau Fermor (2022)

Indigenous Dreamtime Team
   Preston Campbell (2008)
   Ian Lacey (2008)

New Zealand Māori
    Jordan Rapana (2008)

Representative Captains

Test Captains
United States
    Matthew Petersen (2008)

All Stars Game
Indigenous All Stars
    Preston Campbell (2010)

Other honours
Indigenous Dreamtime Team
    Preston Campbell (2008)

Prime Minister's XIII
    Greg Bird (2014)

Representative Coaching Staff

International
Australia
    John Cartwright (Assistant Coach - 2007–08)

State Of Origin
Queensland
    Billy Johnstone (Trainer - 2007–08)

City Vs Country Origin
NSW City
    John Cartwright (Coach - 2009–10)

 
Representatives
Rugby league representative players lists
National Rugby League lists
Gold Coast, Queensland-related lists